Naan Aanaiyittal is a 1966 Indian Tamil-language film directed by Tapi Chanakya and produced by R. M. Veerappan. The film stars M. G. Ramachandran and K. R. Vijaya. It was released on 4 February 1966.

Plot 
Pandhiya, a member of a notorious robber gang, wishes to bring about a change in his gang and turn them towards a righteous path. Velaiya, a member of that gang, commits a murder and frames Pandhiya. To escape the law, Pandhiya disguises himself as a rich man's long-lost son and stays in his house, while Velaiya and the rich man's manager, Kumar, try to out him.

Cast 
 M. G. Ramachandran as Pandhiya
 K. R. Vijaya as Mala
 B. Saroja Devi as Kannagi / Kaveri
 M. N. Nambiar as Velaiya
 R. S. Manohar as Kumar
 S. A. Ashokan as Chezhiyan
 Nagesh as Appu the Great
 Karikol Raju as Mala's relation
 C. R. Parthiban as IG
 O. A. K. Thevar as Muthuveeran
 Sedhupathy as Kanagarathnam

Production 
Naan Aanaiyittal was directed by Tapi Chanakya and produced under Sathya Films by R. M. Veerappan, who also wrote the screenplay. The dialogue was written by Vidwan Lakshmanan and N. Pandurangan. Cinematography was handled by P. N. Sundaram, with editing by Jambulingam.

Soundtrack 
The music was composed by M. S. Viswanathan.

Release and reception 

Naan Aanaiyittal was released on 4 February 1966. It was initially scheduled to release on 14 January 1966, during Pongal, but was pushed back to allow the release of another Ramachandran film, Anbe Vaa. The Indian Express wrote that the film "has all the ingredients to make it appealing to the masses" and praised the performances of Ramachandran and Saroja Devi. T. M. Ramachandran of Sport and Pastime gave a positive review appreciating the film's message, also praising Vidwan Lakshman's dialogue as "sparkling" and M. S. Viswanathan's music as "pleasing," although still being critical of Chanakya's direction, saying it "could have been more inspiring".

References

External links 
 

1960s Tamil-language films
1966 films
Films directed by Tapi Chanakya
Films scored by M. S. Viswanathan